Pauly is a surname. Notable people with the surname include:

 August Pauly, German teacher and encyclopedist
 Adrienne Pauly, French actress and pop-rock singer
 Daniel Pauly, French-born fishery scientist in Canada
 David Pauly, American baseball player
 Dieter Pauly, German football referee
 Hermann Pauly, German chemist
 Ira B. Pauly, American psychiatrist
 Jean Samuel Pauly, Swiss inventor of flying machines and the integrated cartridge.
 John J. Pauly, Marquette University Chancellor
 Louis Pauly, political scientist in Canada
 Mark V. Pauly, American economist
 Max Pauly, German concentration camp commandant executed for war crimes
 Philip J. Pauly (1950–2008), American historian

See also
 Pauly, a TV show
 Pauli, a surname

Surnames from given names
de:Pauly